Sponge is an American rock band formed in Detroit, Michigan in 1992 by vocalist Vinnie Dombroski, guitarist Mike Cross, bassist Tim Cross, drummer Jimmy Paluzzi, and guitarist Joey Mazzola. Dombroski and the Cross brothers were previously in the hard rock band Loudhouse, with Mazzola joining later before the end of the band's tenure. Sponge's discography includes nine studio albums, four live albums, and several charting singles. They are best known for their 1994 hit "Plowed", their 1995 hit "Molly (16 Candles Down the Drain)", and their 1996 hit "Wax Ecstatic (To Sell Angelina)".

Sponge has undergone several lineup changes throughout the band's history, with founder and frontman Dombroski serving as the band's sole constant member. The band released their ninth studio album, Lavatorium, on August 6, 2021.

History

Formation, Rotting Piñata, and Wax Ecstatic (1991–1998)
Vinnie Dombroski, Mike Cross, and Tim Cross were in a hard rock band called Loudhouse, fronted by vocalist Kenny Mugwump. They released one album and had a song appear on the soundtrack to the 1991 film Point Break. The band then recruited Joey Mazzola as a second guitarist. Shortly after, Mugwump decided to pursue a career in acting and directing, so Dombroski switched from drums to vocals and drummer Jimmy Paluzzi was recruited to round out the lineup. The band decided to start fresh and named themselves Sponge. They began working on new music and performed in bars and clubs; recognized for having a dual-guitar sound reminiscent of the MC5. Their debut album, Rotting Piñata, was released in 1994 through Work Group. The songs "Neenah Menasha" and "Plowed" were released as the first and second singles, with "Plowed" entering the Mainstream Rock chart on November 19, 1994. By the end of 1994, Charlie Grover had replaced Paluzzi on drums. Sponge toured with Live, Love Spit Love, and Soundgarden in 1995, and also performed at the music festivals Edgefest, Rock am Ring (Germany), X-Fest, Sunstroke (Ireland), and Pukkelpop (Belgium) that year. "Plowed", along with the third single that was released, "Molly (16 Candles Down the Drain)", received heavy airplay on radio and MTV, and the album was certified gold by the RIAA on July 14, 1995. The fourth single, "Rainin'", was released in October 1995 and had moderate success on the Mainstream Rock and Alternative Songs charts. Rotting Piñata entered the Billboard 200 in February 1995, peaked at #58 in May, and stayed on the chart for 40 weeks.

Throughout 1995 and 1996, the band also performed on several late-night talk shows, including The Jon Stewart Show, The Late Show with David Letterman, and Late Night with Conan O'Brien (with Kay Hanley of Letters to Cleo as a guest vocalist). On June 28, 1996, Sponge, along with Alice in Chains, opened for Kiss at Tiger Stadium in Detroit on their reunion tour. It was previously announced that Stone Temple Pilots would open the show, but had to cancel their performance due to vocalist Scott Weiland's issues related to substance abuse. The show was reported as having an attendance of almost 40,000 people. Sponge's second album, Wax Ecstatic, was released shortly after in 1996 and the first single, "Wax Ecstatic (To Sell Angelina)", received significant airplay on radio and MTV. Sponge also performed on the Lollapalooza festival tour that summer. The second single, "Have You Seen Mary", also received significant airplay and was included in the 1997 film Chasing Amy. Around this time, Sponge's manager Susan Silver retired from the music business to focus on her family. Columbia was dissatisfied with the sales figures for Wax Ecstatic and dropped Sponge from the label once the album left the charts. Undaunted, the band continued making music while in search of a new label.

New Pop Sunday and lineup changes (1999–2002)
Sponge signed a new deal with Beyond Records and released their third album, New Pop Sunday, in 1999. The album was a departure from the grittier sound of their first two albums, featuring songs that were more pop rock in nature. The band also performed again at Edgefest and X-Fest that year. There wasn't much tour support from Beyond and the new album attracted little commercial attention; however, "Live Here Without You" was nominated for the Outstanding National Single award by the Detroit Music Awards Foundation in 2000. Around this time, the Cross brothers had gotten tired of touring and left Sponge. Charlie Grover also left shortly after and the band would go on a brief hiatus. The remaining members (Mazzola and Dombroski) recruited Robby Graham on bass along with Paluzzi on drums to form the side project group Crud.

In 2001, Dombroski was invited by Alice in Chains drummer Sean Kinney to jam with him in Seattle, along with bandmate Mike Inez on bass and Queensrÿche guitarist Chris DeGarmo. The supergroup independently recorded and released an EP entitled Microfish under the name Spys4Darwin. They performed at Endfest on August 4, 2001 and continued working together into the following year. Around this time, Dombroski also began performing and recording music with the side project group The Orbitsuns. It was also around this time that the members of Crud (Dombroski, Mazzola, Paluzzi, and Graham) began performing as Sponge, but only for a handful of local shows. Dombroski and Mazzola then created a new solidified lineup of Sponge consisting of drummer Billy Adams, guitarist Kurt Marschke, and bassist Tim Krukowski.

For All the Drugs in the World, more lineup changes, and The Man (2003–2006)
Sponge released their fourth studio album, For All the Drugs in the World, in 2003 through Idol Records. The album includes songs that were previously released independently by Sponge on an EP of the same name, which was only available at shows and on their website. The band toured with Soul Asylum, Gin Blossoms, Spin Doctors, The Verve Pipe, and The Presidents of the United States of America that year. Around this time, Dombroski created a new lineup once again, this time without other founding member Mazzola, replaced by guitarist Andy Patalan, while Marschke was replaced by guitarist Kyle Neely. At this point, Dombroski became the only remaining original member of Sponge. The band released another EP independently in 2005, entitled Hard to Keep My Cool.
Sponge's fifth studio album, The Man, was also released in 2005 and includes songs from Hard to Keep My Cool plus new tracks. Both Crud and The Orbitsuns also released albums around this time.

Galore Galore and Stop the Bleeding (2007–2014)
In November 2007, Sponge announced that they would release their sixth studio album, Galore Galore, through their new label, Bellum Records. The album was released on December 4, 2007. In 2009, former Sponge producer Tim Patalan replaced Krukowski on bass. The band then independently released an EP entitled Destroy the Boy. The title track was co-written by Mazzola, the first time a former member had contributed to Sponge's new material. In 2010, the video games Tony Hawk: Shred and Guitar Hero: Warriors of Rock were released; the former features the original version of "Plowed" and the latter features a re-recorded version that is available as a downloadable song. Sponge performed with Alice in Chains, Everclear, Seven Mary Three, and Marcy Playground in 2010 and also performed at EarthFest on May 21, 2011. On February 21, 2012, Sponge opened for Guns N' Roses at The Fillmore Detroit during their tour that year. Sponge's seventh studio album, Stop the Bleeding, was released in 2013 and includes songs from Destroy the Boy plus new tracks. Sponge performed on the Summerland festival tour and also toured with Spacehog that year. In 2014, Sponge won the Detroit Music Awards Foundation's Outstanding National Single award for "Come in From the Rain".

The Beer Sessions, original lineup reunion performance, and Lavatorium (2015–present)
Sponge continued recording new music and performed on the Summerland festival tour again in 2016. The band's eighth studio album, The Beer Sessions, was released on October 8, 2016 through Three One Three Records. In May 2018 at the annual Detroit Music Awards, the original lineup of Vinnie Dombroski, Mike Cross, Tim Cross, Jimmy Paluzzi, and Joey Mazzola reunited for one night only. This was the first time in 24 years that all of the original members performed on stage together. The group received the Distinguished Achievement award at the ceremony in recognition of their debut album, Rotting Piñata. Sponge partnered with the Pope Francis Center in 2018 to help raise funds for the poor and homeless in Detroit. The band performed at Howard Stern's SiriusXM studio and toured with The Nixons in 2019. 

Sponge also announced tour dates in North America during the spring and summer of 2020. However, the shows were postponed due to the COVID-19 pandemic, with the aim to reschedule them for a later date. In August 2020, Jason Hartless replaced longtime member Adams on drums. Sponge released a music video for the song "Stitch", directed by James L. Edwards, on July 6, 2021. On August 6, 2021, Sponge released their ninth studio album, Lavatorium, through Cleopatra Records. Around this time, Dave Coughlin replaced Hartless on drums. Sponge performed with Blue October, Gin Blossoms, and Fastball in 2021.

On March 6, 2022, founding guitarist Mike Cross had died at the age of 57.

Musical style and influences
AllMusic described Sponge's sound as being a "versatile blend of classic hard rock and punchy alt-pop with a thin metal veneer". Some of the bands and artists that Sponge has cited as influences include
the MC5, The Stooges, Iggy Pop, David Bowie, The Velvet Underground, Alice Cooper, Bob Seger, Aerosmith, The Beatles, The Rolling Stones, the Sex Pistols, The Clash, Fear, The Psychedelic Furs, and Hank Williams. In concert Sponge has also performed songs by Danny Davis and the Nashville Brass, the Ramones, Lou Reed, AC/DC, and Pink Floyd.

Band members

Current members
Vinnie Dombroski – vocals (1992–2000, 2001–present)
Kyle Neely – guitar, backing vocals (2004–present)
Andy Patalan – guitar, backing vocals (2004–present)
Tim Patalan – bass (2009–present)
Dave Coughlin – drums (2021–present)

Former members
Joey Mazzola – guitar, backing vocals (1992–2000, 2001–2004)
Mike Cross – guitar, backing vocals (1992–2000) (died 2022)
Tim Cross – bass (1992–2000)
Jimmy Paluzzi – drums, backing vocals (1992–1994, 2001)
Charlie Grover – drums (1994–2000)
Robby Graham – bass (2001)
Kurt Marschke – guitar, backing vocals (2001–2004)
Tim Krukowski – bass (2001–2009)
Billy Adams – drums (2001–2020)
Jason Hartless – drums (2020–2021)

Touring substitutes
Steve Dombroski – guitar (2012)
Jeff Hayes – bass (2013–present)

Timeline

Discography

Studio albums

Singles

Live and compilation albums

Soundtracks and other releases

See also

List of alternative rock artists

References

External links
 

 
 
 Static Magazine Interview with Vinnie Dombroski

Musical groups established in 1992
Musical groups from Michigan
Musical groups from Detroit
Alternative rock groups from Michigan
American alternative rock groups
American post-grunge musical groups
1992 establishments in Michigan